Mirny Airport  is an airport in Yakutia, Russia, located  east of the mining town of Mirny. It handles medium-sized aircraft and supports 24-hour flight operations. Mirny airport serves as a diversion airport on Polar route 3. The airport is home base for Alrosa Mirny Air Enterprise. 329,446 passengers were transited by this airport in 2017.

The airport is home to the 17th Independent Transport Aviation Squadron of the Russian Air Force.

Airlines and destinations

Accidents and incidents
On 1 November 2009, an Ilyushin Il-76 cargo jet of the Russian Ministry of Internal Affairs crashed shortly after take-off from Mirny airport, killing all 11 people on board. It was on a repositioning flight to Irkutsk Airport after delivering cargo to Mirny. The Il-76 banked to the right and crashed into the ground near the Mir mine.

References

External links
  Alrosa Mirny Air Enterprise
 Mirny Airport (Аэропорт Мирный) at Russian Airports Database
 
 Historical Weather Records for Mirny
 
 Airport Mirny Aviateka.Handbook
 

Airports built in the Soviet Union
Airports in the Sakha Republic